Mutshatsha is a territory in the Lualaba Province of the Democratic Republic of the Congo.

Territories of Lualaba Province